Syöte National Park (Syötteen kansallispuisto) is a national park in the area of Pudasjärvi, Posio and Taivalkoski municipalities, in Northern Ostrobothnia and Lapland regions of Finland. Syöte National Park is a chain of old-growth forests, part of which is high altitude forest. One fourth of the area of the park is covered by mires and wetlands of different types.

See also 
 Iso-Syöte
 List of national parks of Finland
 Protected areas of Finland

References

External links
 Outdoors.fi – Syöte National Park

Pudasjärvi
Taivalkoski
Posio
National parks of Finland
Protected areas established in 2000
Geography of North Ostrobothnia
Geography of Lapland (Finland)
Tourist attractions in North Ostrobothnia
Tourist attractions in Lapland (Finland)